IV is the fourth studio album by Canadian rock band, Black Mountain, released on April 1, 2016. The five-and-a-half year gap between two studio albums is the longest to date. It is also the band's first album of new work since their 2012 soundtrack album for Year Zero.

Track listing

Charts

References 

2016 albums
Black Mountain (band) albums
Jagjaguwar albums